Asgard is a fictional realm and its capital city appearing in American comic books published by Marvel Comics. Created by Stan Lee, Larry Lieber and Jack Kirby, the realm first appeared in Journey into Mystery #85 (October 1962). Based on the realm of the same name from Germanic mythology (particularly Norse), Asgard is home to the Asgardians and other beings adapted from Norse mythology. It features prominently in stories that follow the Marvel Comics superhero Thor.

Asgard has appeared in comics and various media adaptations, including the Marvel Cinematic Universe films Thor (2011), Thor: The Dark World (2013), Avengers: Age of Ultron (2015), Thor: Ragnarok (2017), Avengers: Endgame (2019), and the Disney+ series Loki (2021). Eventually, Asgard was relocated to Earth and appeared in Avengers: Endgame and Thor: Love and Thunder (2022).

Fictional history
According to Asgardian legend, in the beginning there was nothing, but in time two worlds came into being on opposite sides of the void. The one to the north was named Niflheim, a world of clouds and shadows in whose center surged the fountain Hvergelmir, from which flowed twelve rivers of ice. The one to the south was named Muspelheim, which teemed with rivers of fire. Eventually the warm air from the south carved out the ice giant Ymir from the ice in the north. Ymir became the father of all the giants, and his cow Auðumbla licked out of the ice the first Asgardian, Buri. Buri had a son named Borr, who married the giantess Bestla. Borr and Bestla had three sons named Odin, Vili, and Ve, who were known as the Æsir. Odin and his brothers grew to hate the giants and slew Ymir, and his blood formed a great sea. Odin and his brothers then raised Ymir's body from the sea and created Midgard between Niflheim and Muspelheim. With Ymir's bones they created mountains, and with his hair they created trees. They then raised Ymir's skull upon four pillars to create the heavens. Within the skull contained sparks from Muspelheim, which became the sun, moon, and stars. When Midgard was complete, Odin and his brothers created a home for themselves above it called Asgard. Between the two worlds they stretched a rainbow bridge and called it Bifröst.

Once a year Odin must undertake the Odinsleep to regain his strength. During this time Asgard is vulnerable to attack from its many enemies, most notably Odin's adopted son, Loki. Loki first takes command of Asgard during the Odinsleep, using his right as the 'son' of Odin before Thor could claim it, but fled when Asgard was invaded by Mangog as he realized that this new foe was too powerful. Loki later usurped the throne of Asgard by taking the Odinring, but fled again when Asgard was invaded by the fire demon, Surtur.

The throne of Asgard later passes to Thor after Odin is killed in battle by Surtur, when the demon invades Earth.

It was prophesied that Loki would lead Asgard's enemies in a final conflict known as Ragnarök, which would lead to its destruction. This comes to pass when Loki obtains the forge that created Mjolnir and creates new uru hammers for his army. The entirety of Asgard and its inhabitants are destroyed in the resulting battle.

After Ragnarök, Donald Blake awakens Thor from the "Void of Non-Existence". Thor returns to Earth and rebuilds Asgard outside of Broxton, Oklahoma, purchasing the land with gold from the treasury. Thor then goes about restoring the Asgardians, who have been reborn in the bodies of mortal men and women.

Asgard's location on Earth makes the city a target during the "Secret Invasion" by the Skrulls led by a Super-Skrull named Godkiller, whose powers mimic Thundra, Titania, Volcana and Battleaxe. The aliens are repelled with help from Thor's ally, Beta Ray Bill.

When Thor is forced to abdicate the throne and is exiled for killing his grandfather Bor, who was brought from the past and driven mad by Loki, control of Asgard passes to Thor's half-brother, Balder.

Asgard is destroyed yet again after Norman Osborn seizes control of S.H.I.E.L.D. following the Secret Invasion as he seeks to expel Asgard from U.S. soil in an effort to consolidate power. Osborn leads the Dark Avengers in the Siege of Asgard. The invading forces are defeated with help from the reunited Avengers, although Asgard itself is toppled by the Sentry. Immediately following the Siege, Thor reerects Heimdall's observatory atop Stark Tower as sign of solidarity with Midgard and appreciation for the Avengers' aid.

Thor restores Odin to the throne when the nine realms are invaded by "the World Eaters". However, after Thor and Odin's long-forgotten brother Cul, kill each other in battle during the "Fear Itself" event, Odin passes control of Asgard to the Vanir, headed by the "All-Mother", a triumvirate of female deities consisting of Freyja, Gaea and Idunn. Tony Stark's company, Stark Resilient then rebuilds Asgard over Broxton, Oklahoma, where it is rechristened as "Asgardia".

During the "Original Sin" storyline, it is revealed that there is a Tenth Realm in Asgard called Heven that is inhabited by Angels. It was cut off from the rest of the realms following the Angels' attack on Asgard which led to the apparent death of an infant Angela.

Asgard later established the Congress of Worlds which consists of the representatives of the Nine Realms. After Heven was reintegrated with the other Realms, representatives of Heven started appearing as members of the Congress of Worlds.

Regions
The Asgardian dimension contains several distinct regions.

The Nine Realms

Other worlds and regions

The six races
The six races of intelligent humanoid beings known to reside within the Asgardian dimension.

Not to be confused with the dragon Fafnir.

Racial attributes 
Although they look human, all Asgardians possess certain superhuman physical attributes. They are extremely long-lived (though not immortal like their Olympian counterparts), aging at an extremely slow rate upon reaching adulthood (through the periodic consumption of the golden apples of Idunn). Asgardian flesh and bone is three times denser than similar human tissue, contributing to their superhuman strength and weight. An average Asgardian male can lift 30 tons (27.2 metric tons); an average Asgardian female can lift about 25 tons (22.7 metric tons). Asgardians are immune to all terrestrial diseases and resistant to conventional injury (however this resilience seems relatively incapable of defeating the zombie plague in Earth-2149 that affects even Asgardians). The metabolism of the Asgardians gives them superhuman stamina in all physical activities.

Demons are beings of fire and tend to be about the same stature as the Asgardians.

Dwarves are smaller in stature than the Asgardians, and have short, stocky bodies.

Elves vary greatly in size from four to eight feet (1.2 to 2.4 meters). They tend toward slender bodies and proportionately longer limbs. The dark elves tend to be darker in color than the light elves. Both types have natural proclivity towards magic.

Giants are basically humanoid in appearance and color although they tend toward the neanderthalic in body and bone structure. Their most distinguishing feature is their height. On occasion giants will produce stunted offspring who look similar to the Asgardians. Loki and the Executioner are both children of giants despite their diminutive six or seven foot (1.8 or 2.1 meter) stature.

Trolls are the least human-looking of the denizens of Asgard, possessing body characteristics that are almost simian. Trolls are stocky and massive, have thick body hair (almost fur) and tend toward a ruddy orange color. Trolls tend to be extremely strong, stronger than the average Asgardian, dwarf or elf and on par with giants. Trolls like Ulik rival Thor in strength.

Flora and fauna

Flora

Yggdrasil; the world tree is an immense ash tree that is central to the Asgardian dimension. The tree is supported by three roots that extended far into the other worlds; one to the spring of Hvergelmir in Niflheim, one to the well of Mimir in Jotunheim, and another to the well of Wyrd in Asgard. Though Midgard is not physically connected to Yggdrasil, it is said that the Earth's axis is in alignment with the tree. In the limited series Thor: Blood Oath, Thor and the Warriors Three are sent to retrieve golden apples from the branches of the tree. Odin once hung himself from the tree for nine days and nights as a sacrifice to gain knowledge of the runes. Thor repeated this action during Ragnarök. Later Amora the Enchantress attempt to destroy the tree in an effort to free the body of Skurge the Executioner from its roots, an action that nearly tore apart the fabric of reality.

Fauna
 Dragons are ancient creatures that are stated to live in Nastrond. These include Fafnir, Hakurel; a dragon Thor slew during one of his earliest adventures, and Níðhöggr; who feeds on the roots of Yggdrasil.
 Eagles are giant sapient versions of their Earthly counterparts. These include Gnori; king of snow eagles whom a young Thor, Sif and Balder sought for one of his feathers as part of a quest, and Lerad; an eagle that guards the magic apples of Yggdrasil. Volstagg was able to steal an apple by first beating Lerad in a drinking contest.
 Fenris Wolf; a giant wolf that is said to be the offspring of Loki and the giantess Angrboda. During Ragnarök Fenris swallowed all that remained of Asgard following the final battle.
 Geri and Freki are Odin's pet wolves. Freki stopped an assassination attempt on Thor's life during a time known as the Reigning when Thor assumed the throne of Asgard and ruled both Asgard and Midgard with an iron fist.
 Huginn and Muninn are Odin's pet ravens. They guided Thor to find the means to end the Ragnarök cycle and again through Hel to find Odin.
 Midgard Serpent; an immense serpent that lives in the Sea of Space circling Midgard, ready to eat unwary sailors.
 Rattatosk; a squirrel that lives on Yggdrasil and carries messages between Lerad and Níðhöggr. As a child Thor would go to Yggdrasil to visit Rattatosk and listen to his stories.
 Sleipnir; Odin's eight-legged steed. Thor had eight steeds Firegnaw, Mudbrute, Slaughterbit, Smokemare, Snow Harpy, Stormbringer, Swamptooth and Warhoof. During a famine on earth, some humans ate the horses over Thor's request that they not do so. The God of Thunder took the bones back to Asgard. Using magics, he reformed them into Sleipnir.
 Toothgnasher and Toothgrinder; two mystical goats that pull Thor's chariot.

Reception

Accolades 

 In 2019, CBR.com ranked Asgard 6th in their "10 Most Iconic Superhero Hideouts In Marvel Comics" list.

In other media

Television
 Asgard appears in the Spider-Man and His Amazing Friends episode "The Vengeance of Loki."
 Asgard is featured in The Super Hero Squad Show.
 Asgard was introduced in The Avengers: Earth's Mightiest Heroes episode "Thor the Mighty".
 Asgard appears in the Ultimate Spider-Man episode "Field Trip".
 Asgard appears in the Avengers Assemble episode "Planet Doom." Vanaheim appears in the episode "Downgraded." Hawkeye and Falcon accidentally end up in Vanaheim where they help Freya defend her city from the Shadow Nyx while finding a way to rekindle the light that keeps the Shadow Nyx at bay.
 Asgard appears in the Hulk and the Agents of S.M.A.S.H. episode "For Asgard" and "Days of Future Smash: Smashguard".
 Asgard appears in the Guardians of the Galaxy episode "We are the World Tree."

Film

 Asgard is the setting of Marvel Animation film Hulk vs. Thor.
 Asgard is the setting of the animated film Thor: Tales of Asgard.
 Asgard and Jotunheim appear in the 2011 live-action Marvel Studios film Thor, directed by Kenneth Branagh.
 Asgard, Svartalfheim, Vanaheim, and Jotunheim appear in the 2013 sequel Thor: The Dark World, directed by Alan Taylor. Muspelheim is also seen briefly through a dimensional rift.
 Asgard and Muspelheim appear in the 2017 sequel Thor: Ragnarok, directed by Taika Waititi. The film opens in Muspelheim, where Thor defeats Surtur before returning to Asgard. In the finale, Thor and Loki summon Surtur to destroy the Asgard planetoid, in order to defeat Hela. Thor leads the Asgardian people on a spaceship headed for Earth, to create a new homeland to settle in. Hel is also seen briefly when Hela is released and in flashback when she fights the Valkyries in an attempt to escape.
 Nidavellir appears in the 2018 film Avengers: Infinity War, directed by the Russo brothers. Thor, along with Rocket and Groot, travel there to ask the dwarf Eitri to forge a new weapon that can kill Thanos. In the film, Nidavellir is a neutron star surrounded by a forge which the dwarves used to craft weapons.
 In the 2019 film Avengers: Endgame, also directed by the Russo brothers, Thor establishes a new homeland for the Asgardians called "New Asgard", in Tønsberg, Norway. Thor and Rocket time travel to 2013 Asgard during the events of Thor: The Dark World to retrieve the 2013 Reality Stone in order to undo Thanos wiping out half of all life in the universe.

Video games
 Asgard is featured as a playable level in Marvel: Ultimate Alliance.
 Asgard is featured in the Marvel Super Hero Squad video game.
 Asgard is featured in Thor: God of Thunder (based on the live-action film).
 Asgard is a stage in the fighting game Marvel vs. Capcom 3: Fate of Two Worlds/Ultimate Marvel vs. Capcom 3, alongside a "Sea of Space" version in Ultimate Marvel vs. Capcom 3.
 Asgard appears in Marvel Super Hero Squad Online.
 Asgard appears in Marvel Heroes.
 Asgard appears in Lego Marvel Super Heroes, Lego Marvel's Avengers and Lego Marvel Super Heroes 2.
 Asgard appears as a stage in Marvel vs. Capcom Infinite, merged with Abel City from the Mega Man X series to become Xgard.
 Asgard appears in the digital collectible card game Marvel Snap.

Theme parks
 The Disneyland attraction "Treasures of Asgard", located inside Innoventions in Tomorrowland, opened on November 1, 2013, and features displays of Asgardian relics and transports guests to Odin's throne room in Asgard, where they are greeted by Thor.

References

External links
 
 Asgard at the Marvel Database wiki
 Asgard at the Marvel Directory
 Nine Realms from Marvel Cinematic Database

Asgard in fiction
Fictional populated places
Marvel Comics dimensions
Thor (Marvel Comics)
Fictional elements introduced in 1962